Collingham may refer to:

Collingham, Nottinghamshire
Collingham, West Yorkshire
Collingham College